The 2004 South American Rugby Championship was the 26th edition of the competition of the leading national Rugby Union teams in South America.

The tournament was played in Santiago, Chile with four team participating.

Argentina won the tournament.

Standings 
 Three point for victory, two for draw, and one for lost 
{| class="wikitable"
|-
!width=165|Team
!width=40|Played
!width=40|Won
!width=40|Drawn
!width=40|Lost
!width=40|For
!width=40|Against
!width=40|Difference
!width=40|Pts
|- bgcolor=#ccffcc align=center
|align=left| 
|3||3||0||0||261||20||+ 241||9
|- align=center
|align=left| 
|3||2||0||1||122||90||+ 32||7
|- align=center
|align=left| 
|3||1||0||2||111||68||+ 43||5
|- align=center
|align=left| 
|3||0||0||3||18||334||- 316||3
|}

Results  
First Round

Second Round

Third Round

References

2004
A
2004 in Argentine rugby union
rugby union
rugby union
rugby union
International rugby union competitions hosted by Chile
2004 rugby union tournaments for national teams